Laves phases are intermetallic phases that have composition AB2 and are named for Fritz Laves who first described them.  The phases are classified on the basis of geometry alone. While the problem of packing spheres of equal size has been well-studied since Gauss, Laves phases are the result of his investigations into packing spheres of two sizes. Laves phases fall into three Strukturbericht types: cubic MgCu2 (C15), hexagonal MgZn2 (C14), and hexagonal MgNi2 (C36). The latter two classes are unique forms of the hexagonal arrangement, but share the same basic structure. In general, the A atoms are ordered as in diamond, hexagonal diamond, or a related structure, and the B atoms form tetrahedra around the A atoms for the AB2 structure. 

Laves phases are of particular interest in modern metallurgy research because of their abnormal physical and chemical properties. Many hypothetical or primitive applications have been developed. However, little practical knowledge has been elucidated from Laves phase study so far.
A characteristic feature is the almost perfect electrical conductivity, but they are not plastically deformable at room temperature.

At this size ratio, the structure has an overall packing volume density of 0.710. Compounds found in Laves phases typically have an atomic size ratio between 1.05 and 1.67. Analogues of Laves phases can be formed by the self-assembly of a colloidal dispersion of two sizes of sphere.

References

Intermetallics
Crystal structure types